JAAF is a four-letter abbreviation which may refer to:

Japanese Army Air Force
Japan Association of Athletics Federations
Journal of Accounting, Auditing and Finance

See also
Jaff tribe